Madhuca bourdillonii is a species of flowering plant in the family Sapotaceae. It is endemic to India, where it is known only from Kerala. Recent surveys failed to locate any specimens. The species has been exploited for its wood.

References

Endemic flora of India (region)
bourdillonii
Endangered plants
Taxonomy articles created by Polbot